George Woodhouse (29 July 1829 – 3 September 1883) was an English architect who practised from offices in Bolton, and Oldham, then in the county of Lancashire. He collaborated with William Hill on the designs for Bolton Town Hall.

Career
He was born on 19 July 1829 at Lindley, near Huddersfield, the son of John Woodhouse (1788–1862) and Sarah Moor (1788–1875), and baptised on 13 August 1829 in Zion Methodist New Connexion Chapel, Lindley. At age 15 he was apprenticed to James Whittaker of Silverwell Yard of Bradshawgate and later John Williamson Whittaker with whom he entered into partnership. This partnership lasted until 1852.

In independent practice, he had offices at St George's Road, Bolton (from 1860), and Clegg Street, Oldham in  Greater Manchester. 

He worked in partnership with Edward Potts (1839–1909) from 1861 until 1872 and was later in partnership with William James Morley (1847–1930) around 1883.

He was a prominent Wesleyan Methodist, and was for many years organist of Park Street Chapel.

He was married three times:
Firstly to Emma Crosland (1833–1860) of Yew Tree, Lindley at Highfield Independent Chapel on 17 December 1851. 
Secondly to Ellen Piggott (1834–1867) on 19 June 1862 in Barnsley, Yorkshire. The children from this marriage were:
George Herbert Woodhouse (1863–1925)
Emma Woodhouse (1865–1907)
John Arthur Woodhouse (1866–1949)
Thirdly to Harriett Knowles (1849–1894), daughter of Robert Knowles of West Bank, Bolton in the Parish Church at Lytham on 20 April 1871. The children from this marriage were:
Robert Knowles Woodhouse (1872–1955)
Noel Woodhouse (1873–1946)
Henry Basil Woodhouse (1877–1951)
William Gilbert Woodhouse (1879–1963)
Alfred Victor Woodhouse (1881–1911)

He died on 3 September 1883 in Uttoxeter, Staffordshire and was interred in the graveyard of St Peter's Church, Halliwell.

Notable works

References

External links 

Manchester Victorian Architects

1829 births
1883 deaths
19th-century English architects
Gothic Revival architects
British neoclassical architects
English ecclesiastical architects
Architects from Yorkshire
English organists
Architects from Huddersfield
Architects from Greater Manchester
19th-century organists